The 1965 Miami Redskins football team was an American football team that represented Miami University in the Mid-American Conference (MAC) during the 1965 NCAA University Division football season. In their third season under Bo Schembechler, Miami compiled a 7–3 record (5–1 against MAC opponents), finished in a tie with Bowling Green for the MAC championship, and outscored all opponents by a combined total of 247 to 137.  After the season, Schembechler was selected as the MAC Coach of the Year.

The team's statistical leaders included quarterback Bruce Matte with 1,016 passing yards, halfback Al Moore with 677 rushing yards, and end John Erisman with 433 receiving yards.

Linebacker Jim Bright won the team's most valuable player award. Seven Miami players were selected as first-team All-MAC players: Matte, Moore, Erisman, Bright, end Gary Durchik, tackle Ed Philpott, and center Tom Stillwagon. Jim Bright, Don Peddie, and Paul Schudel were the team captains.

Schedule

References

Miami
Miami RedHawks football seasons
Mid-American Conference football champion seasons
Miami Redskins football